The Union Pacific FEF Series consists of forty-five 4-8-4 "Northern" steam locomotive types built by the American Locomotive Company (ALCO) between 1937 and 1944 and operated by the Union Pacific Railroad until 1959.

The 45 locomotives were the last steam locomotives built for the Union Pacific. They represented the apex of dual-service steam locomotive development; funds and research were being concentrated into the development of diesel-electric locomotives. Designed to burn coal, they were converted to run on fuel oil in 1946. They pulled a variety of passenger trains, such as the Overland Limited, Los Angeles Limited, Portland Rose and Challenger, until diesel-electric locomotives took over passenger service. Many FEF Series locomotives were later reassigned to freight service during the last few years of their careers.

Four FEF Series locomotives survive today, including No. 844, which remains in operational condition and now runs in excursion service. Today, the 844 is one of the Union Pacific's oldest serving locomotives and the only steam locomotive never retired by a North American Class I railroad.

Origins
During the late 1930s, the rising trainloads started to exceed the limits of the 4-8-2 that  were the mainstay of the UP passenger operations. One day, in 1937, with UP President William Jeffer's business car in the rear, a "7000" Class 4-8-2 demonstrated the lack of steaming power inherent in the type. Even when the train was waiting for rescue, a telegram was sent to ALCO in Schenectady seeking something better. The result was a superb class of 45 locomotives that could run at 100 mph and produce between 4,000 and 5,000 drawbar horsepower. They also ran about 14,000 miles a month.

Models
The FEF Series consisted of three classes of steam locomotives: FEF-1, FEF-2, and FEF-3.

FEF-1
The first twenty locomotives, numbered 800–819, were delivered by ALCO in 1937. The "800"s as a whole followed – like Northumbrian 108 years earlier – the simplest possible arrangement of only having two outside cylinders. Fitting ALCO's lateral motion devices to the leading coupled wheels eased the negotiation of curves. Complicated accessories often spoiled the basic simplicity of so many US locomotives, but UP resisted most of them, resulting in an elegant, uncluttered appearance.

FEF-2
The second batch of fifteen was delivered in 1939. These had several improvements, including larger cylinders, better tractive effort, smoke deflectors on the sides of the smokebox, and the driving wheel diameter was increased by three inches. The greatest change, however, was the provision of a fourteen wheeled "pedestal" or "centipede" tender, in place of the twelve wheeled ones of the first twenty locomotives. Thus, the first locomotives became known as "FEF-1," while these were known as "FEF-2."

FEF-3
Except for the use of some substitute materials, the final batch of ten were nearly identical to the FEF-2. After World War II, coal supplies were affected by a series of strikes. In order to safeguard operations, UP converted the 800s to oil burning, and a  tank was fitted in the bunker space. Otherwise, few modifications were needed to ensure years of mainline service. These were the last steam locomotives delivered for the UP. Like many of the "late era" steam locomotives, their final design was cut short by the advent of diesel locomotives, the new monarchs of the rails.

Surviving examples
Four FEF Series locomotives survive. Two, No. 814 (FEF-1) and No. 833 (FEF-2), are on static display. A third, No. 844 (FEF-3), has remained operational and is currently used in excursion service. There is also a fourth locomotive, No. 838 (FEF-3); however it is solely used as a source of spare parts for No. 844.

See also
Union Pacific Challenger
Union Pacific Big Boy

References

 Union Pacific Northerns at steamlocomotive.com maintained by Wes Barris

Further reading

4-8-4 locomotives
ALCO locomotives
FEF
Steam locomotives of the United States
Railway locomotives introduced in 1937